The Molecular Ancestry Network (MANET) database is a bioinformatics database that maps evolutionary relationships of protein architectures directly onto biological networks. It was originally developed by Hee Shin Kim, Jay E. Mittenthal and Gustavo Caetano-Anolles in the Department of Crop Sciences of the University of Illinois at Urbana-Champaign.

MANET traces for example the ancestry of individual metabolic enzymes in metabolism with bioinformatic, phylogenetic, and statistical methods. MANET currently links information in the Structural Classification of Proteins (SCOP) database, the metabolic pathways database of the Kyoto Encyclopedia of Genes and Genomes (KEGG), and phylogenetic reconstructions describing the evolution of protein fold architecture at a universal level. The database has been updated to reflect evolution of metabolism at the level of protein fold families. MANET literally "paints" the ancestries of enzymes derived from rooted phylogenetic trees directly onto over one hundred metabolic pathways representations, paying homage to one of the fathers of impressionism. It also provides numerous functionalities that enable searching specific protein folds with defined ancestry values, displaying the distribution of enzymes that are painted, and exploring quantitative details describing individual protein folds. This permits the study of global and local metabolic network architectures, and the extraction of evolutionary patterns at global and local levels.

A statistical analysis of the data in MANET showed for example a patchy distribution of ancestry values assigned to protein folds in each subnetwork, indicating that evolution of metabolism occurred globally by widespread recruitment of enzymes. MANET was used recently to sort out enzymatic recruitment processes in metabolic networks and propose that modern metabolism originated in the purine nucleotide metabolic subnetwork. The database is useful for the study of metabolic evolution.

External links
 Molecular Ancestry Network (MANET) database

References 

Biological databases